The 19709 / 19710 Udaipur City–Kamakhya Kavi Guru Express is an Express train of the Kavi Guru series belonging to Indian Railways – North Western Railway zone that runs between  and  in India.

It operates as train number 19709 from Udaipur City to Kamakhya and as train number 19710 in the reverse direction, serving the states of Rajasthan, Uttar Pradesh, Bihar, West Bengal and Assam.

For the convenience of passengers, Kavi Guru Express was extended up to Udaipur City in 2019.

Coaches

The 19709 / 19710 Udaipur City–Kamakhya Kavi Guru Express has 1 AC 2 tier, 5 AC 3 tier, 8 Sleeper class, 6 General Unreserved & 2 SLR (Seating cum Luggage Rake) coaches. It carries a pantry car 

As is customary with most train services in India, coach composition may be amended at the discretion of Indian Railways depending on demand.

Service

As the average speed of the train is below , as per Indian Railways rules, its fare does not include a Superfast surcharge.

Routeing

The 19709 / 19710 Udaipur City–Kamakhya Kavi Guru Express runs from

RAJASTHAN
Udaipur City via 

UTTAR PRADESH
Achhnera Junction

BIHAR

WEST BENGAL
New Jalpaiguri (Siliguri)
Dalgaon Railway Station
 to

ASSAM
Kamakhya Railway Station

Traction

The train is hauled by a -based WDP-4D locomotive from Kamakhya till New Jalpaiguri, after which a Vadodara Loco Shed-based WAP-7 locomotive hauls the train for the rest of its journey.

Operation

19709 Udaipur City–Kamakhya Kavi Guru Express runs from Udaipur City every Monday reaching Kamakhya on the 3rd day.
19710 Kamakhya–Udaipur City Kavi Guru Express runs from Kamakhya every Thursday reaching Udaipur City on the 3rd day.

Incidents
This incident details is 2013 Chapramari Forest train accident Surviving elephants initially fled but soon returned to the scene of the accident and remained there until being dispersed by officials.

See also

 Kavi Guru Express

References 

 http://media2.intoday.in/businesstoday/images/RailBudget_2011-12.pdf
 https://www.youtube.com/watch?v=ccQ0eVhdE-Y
 http://news.webindia123.com/news/articles/India/20111114/1871633.html
 http://www.nwr.indianrailways.gov.in/uploads/files/1321022551862-pr_11.11.11.docx_1.pdf
 https://www.youtube.com/watch?v=78r3tFej83U

External links

Kavi Guru Express trains
Rail transport in Rajasthan
Rail transport in Uttar Pradesh
Rail transport in Bihar
Rail transport in West Bengal
Rail transport in Assam
Transport in Jaipur
Transport in Guwahati
Railway services introduced in 2011